Yosef Shiloach (July 9, 1941 – January 3, 2011) was an Israeli actor.

Biography
Yosef Shiloach was born in Kurdistan. He immigrated to Israel at the age of nine. Shiloach was one of the first graduates of the Beit Zvi acting school.

In 1964, Shiloach appeared in his first film, Mishpachat Simchon. He went on to appear in many Israeli films, especially the Bourekas film genre which portrays the life of Sephardi Jews in an exaggerated comic manner. He often played parts of people of Persian descent. He also appeared in international films, such as I Love You Rosa, The House on Chelouche Street and Rambo III.

As an occasional voice actor, Shiloach provided the Hebrew voice of Arik (Ernie) on Rechov Sumsum, which is the Israeli TV version of Sesame Street.

Death
Shiloach died in Tel Aviv on January 3, 2011, aged 69, after a lengthy battle with cancer. He was survived by a wife and three daughters.

Selected filmography

Kommando Sinai (1968) - Captain Halil, Egyptian Army
Margo Sheli (1969) - Hotel Manager
Ha-Pritza Hagdola (1970) - Heikal
La salamandra del deserto (1970)
Katz V'Carasso (1971) - Kadosh Carasso
The Policeman (1971) - Amar
I Love You Rosa (1972) - Eli
Ha-Balash Ha'Amitz Shvartz (1973) - Simcha
Abu el Banat (1973) - Joseph Omri
The House on Chelouche Street (1973) - Nissim
Hagiga Le'enayim (1975)
The Story of Jacob and Joseph (1974)
Hagiga B'Snuker (1975) - Salvador 
Rosebud (1975) - Hacam
Diamonds (1975) - Mustafa 
Mishpahat Tzan'ani (1976) - Ben Naim
The Passover Plot (1976) - Zealot (uncredited)
Street 60 (1976) - Himself
Hamesh Ma'ot Elef Shahor (1977)
Vengeance (1977) - Lupe
Hatzilu Et HaMatzil (1977)
Nisuin Nusah Tel Aviv (1979) - Avram
Natziv Hamelech (1979)
Jesus (1979) - Joseph
Melech LeYom Ehad (1980)
Kohav Hashahar (1980) - Uncle Sammy
Sofo Shel Milton Levy (1981)
Sapiches (1982) - Sgt.Shemesh / Ramirez
Paradise (1982) - Ahmed
Sababa (1983) - 1st Sgt. Shemesh
Sahara (1983) - Halef
Green (1984)
The Ambassador (1984) - Shimon
Ha-Doda Mi'Argentina (1984)
Up Your Anchor (1985) - Georgiyan
Ha-Shiga'on Hagadol (1986) - Jacuzzi
Ha-Tov, HaRa, VeHaLo-Nora (1986)
Alex Holeh Ahavah (1986) - Faruk
Iron Eagle (1986) - Tower Official
The Lion of Africa (1987)
Rambo III (1988) - Khalid 
Tzamot (1989)
Not Without My Daughter (1991) - Mohsen's Companion
American Cyborg: Steel Warrior (1993) - Akmir
Night Terrors (1993) - Pardy Hardy
The Mummy Lives (1993) - Capt. Mahmoud 
Chain of Command (1994) - Azil
Leylasede (1995) - Michael
Nashim (1996)
Ben (1997)
Desperado Square (2001) - Yisrael 'the Indian'
Yamim Shel Ahava (2005) - Yossef Dahan (final film role)

See also
Israeli cinema

References

External links

1941 births
2011 deaths
Beit Zvi School for the Performing Arts alumni
Israeli male film actors
Israeli male television actors
Israeli male stage actors
20th-century Israeli male actors
21st-century Israeli male actors
Iranian emigrants to Israel
Israeli people of Kurdish-Jewish descent
Israeli people of Iranian-Jewish descent
Jewish Israeli male actors
20th-century Israeli Jews
21st-century Israeli Jews
Kurdish Jews
Iranian Jews
Iranian Kurdish people
Israeli Mizrahi Jews
Deaths from cancer in Israel